Minsk District is a second-level administrative subdivision (raion) of Belarus in Minsk Region.

The administrative seat is the city of Minsk, administratively separated from the raion. The most populated town of the proper raion is Zaslawye.

Geography
The district is situated both in the middle of Minsk Region and of the Belarus. It is crossed by the Svislach River and the towns around Minsk are part of its metropolitan area.

It borders, from north to south in a clockwise sense, with the districts of Vilejka, Lahoysk, Smalyavichy, Chervyen, Pukhavichy, Uzda, Dzyarzhynsk, Valozhyn and Maladzyechna.

Subdivision
The district is divided into 18 rural councils (sieĺsaviets) and 37 municipalities (including Minsk).

Rural councils
The 18 sieĺsaviets are: Astrašycki Haradok, Baraŭliany, Harani, Ždanovičy, Juzufova, Kalodziščy, Krupica, Lašany, Luhavaja Slabada, Michanavičy, Novy Dvor, Papiernia, Piatryški, Samachvalavičy, Sienica, Chaciežyna, Šaršuny, Ščomyslica.

Municipalities
The 37 municipalities counts one autonomous city (Minsk), one town (Zaslawye), one urban-type settlement (Machulishi), and 34 simple municipalities (Population as of 2009).

Notable residents
Yan Matusevich (1946, Komenka village – 1998), first dean of the modern Belarusian Greek Catholic Church 
Ernst Sabila (1932, Dzehciaroŭka village – 2022), Belarusian Protestant religious leader, dissident and Gulag survivor

See also
 Minsk Automobile Ring Road

References

External links

 
Districts of Minsk Region